Pistolul calibrul 7,65mm Model 1974, also known as Pistolul Carpați, is a series of light semi-automatic pistols designed and manufactured by Fabrica de Arme Cugir of Romania. It was initially introduced as a side-arm for submachine gun equipped units of the Romanian Army and is currently issued as a self-defence weapon in the Romanian Police.

Design
Pistolul Carpați Md. 1974 was designed by Întreprinderea Mecanică Cugir, currently Fabrica de Arme Cugir. Its construction is similar to that of the Walther PP/PPK semi-automatic pistol, but it is not a direct copy of it.

The body is made of duraluminium. It works as a double-action weapon on the first shot and as a single-action weapon for subsequent shots. Rounds are automatically fed from the 8-round magazine and the weapon is self-arming. The barrel has four rifling grooves and is coated with a thin layer of chrome.

Users
Once the standard side-arm of the Romanian Police, Pistolul Carpați Md. 1974 is currently being replaced in service by the Glock 17 semi-automatic pistol and serves only as a self-defense weapon. The Romanian Army still has stocks of this weapon, but it is no longer issued to servicemen. It is, however, still issued to some of the police departments.

In July 2020 a new contract for the Romanian Police was started to be honored, and the Beretta Px4 Storm went into service. The first 5.000 out of a total of 25.000 units have already arrived in the country.

References

External links
 Technical specifications from the manufacturer's website
 Video showing weapon disassembly

Police weapons
.32 ACP semi-automatic pistols
Weapons and ammunition introduced in 1974
Semi-automatic pistols of Romania